Harry Wetter (3 February 1882 – 4 February 1934) was an English-born international, rugby union centre who played club rugby for Newport and county rugby with Glamorgan and Monmouthshire. He won just two caps for Wales but is most notable for being a member of the Newport team that beat the 1912 touring South African team. He was also a member of the Wales bowls and baseball team.

Rugby career
Wetter first played rugby for Pill Harriers the notoriously hard team from Newport Docks. He switched to first-class team Newport in 1903 and in 1906 was chosen for the Newport team to face Paul Roos's touring South African team. Although Newport lost the match, Wetter would win the return match when he faced the second touring South African team, again with Newport, in 1912.

In 1912, Wetter won his first Welsh cap against the touring South Africans, in a game at the Cardiff Arms Park. His only other match for his country was against England in 1913, Wales lost badly and Wetter was one of eight players that were never selected for Wales again.

International matches played
Wales
  England 1913
  South Africa 1912

Bibliography

References

1882 births
1934 deaths
Newport RFC players
Monmouthshire County RFC players
Wales international rugby union players
Welsh police officers
Rugby union props
Pill Harriers RFC players
People from Southsea
Rugby union players from Portsmouth
Officers in Welsh police forces